Mi2 is a Slovenian rock band founded in Rogatec in 1995. The band's members include Jernej Dirnbek (guitarist and songwriter), Tone Kregar (singer and songwriter), Egon Herman (guitar), Robert Novak (bass guitar), and Igor Orač (percussion). Mi2 is a representative of Slovenian comedy rock music tradition that was established by Buldožer and is continued by other bands, such as Zmelkoow.

Book
 Mohor, H. (2009) Biografija (Biography), Litera, Maribor,

Discography

Singles 
Vstati in obstati
Hči vaškega učitelja
Stara duša 
Samo tebe te imam
Pojdi z menoj v toplice
Moja teta Estera
Odhajaš
Pa si šla
Zbudi me za prvi maj
Oda gudeki
Črtica
Ko bil sn še mali pizdun
Sv. Margareta
Sve ove godine
Štajersko nebo
Čakal sn te ko kreten
Brigita (z Ulice Maršala Tita)
Sladka kot med
Ti nisi ta
Ljubezen pod topoli

Albums
 Črtica (1996)
 Čudo tehnike (1999)
 Album leta (2000)
 Dečki s Sotle (2002)
 Dobrodošli na dvor (2006)
 Rokenrol (2010)
 Decibeli (2012)
 Čista jeba (2014)

References

External links
Official site 

Slovenian rock music groups
Musical groups established in 1995
1995 establishments in Slovenia